Parliamentary elections were held in Djibouti on 23 February 2018. The election was boycotted by the main opposition parties, including some of the parties in the Union for National Salvation coalition, which had won 10 seats in the previous elections in 2013.

According to government figures, the ruling Union for the Presidential Majority won 57 of 65 seats in Parliament. The opposition Union for Democracy and Justice–Djibouti Party for Development (UDJ–PDD)  won seven seats in Djibouti city electoral district. The UMP ran unopposed in three electoral districts (Dikhil, Obock and Arta, 18 seats).

Electoral system
Prior to the 2013 the previous winner-takes-all party block vote was abandoned. Instead the elections were held using a closed list system in which 80% of seats (rounded to the nearest integer) in each constituency were awarded to the party receiving the most votes. The remaining seats were allocated proportionally to other parties receiving over 10% of the vote using the D'Hondt method. In cases where no other party received more than 10% of the vote, all seats in a constituency were awarded to the party receiving the most votes. There was also a 25% female quota, up from 10% in the previous election.

Results

By region

References

Elections in Djibouti
Djibouti
Parliamentary
Djibouti